Dystasia cristata is a species of beetle in the family Cerambycidae. It was described by Warren Samuel Fisher in 1933.

References

Pteropliini
Beetles described in 1933